Evogene is a computational biology company based in Israel. Evogene Ltd. (NASDAQ:EVGN) has developed a unique computational predictive biology "CPB" platform, which leverages big data with advanced algorithms such as machine learning and other artificial intelligence ("AI"), while adding a deep understanding of biology and advanced biological technologies. Evogene is using its proprietary CPB platform to computationally design and develop next-generation life-science products based upon three core components: microbes, small molecules, and genetic elements.

Evogene's computational platform allows it to substantially increase the probability of successful life-science product development, increase the efficacy and reduce the toxicity of its life-science products while reducing time and cost to development. Its strategic partners include BASF (OTCQX:BASFY), Bayer (OTCPK:BAYZF), Corteva (CTVA), ICL Group Ltd. (ICL) as well as various academic and medical institutions.

References

Companies listed on the Tel Aviv Stock Exchange
Companies listed on the New York Stock Exchange
Biotechnology companies of Israel
Rehovot
Israeli companies established in 2002